Peter Reiter can refer to:

 Peter Reiter (footballer)
 Peter Reiter (judoka)